The 1922 Saint Louis Billikens football team was an American football team that represented Saint Louis University during the 1922 college football season. In their second and final season under head coach Stephen G. O'Rourke, the Billikens compiled a 6–3–1 record and outscored their opponents by a total of 152 to 82. The team played its home games at St. Louis University Athletic Field on the school's campus in St. Louis.

Schedule

References

Saint Louis
Saint Louis Billikens football seasons
Saint Louis Billikens football